El Rahamnah is a small city in Damietta Governorate, Egypt.

The ancient village Pihormes Tamoul was located in the vicinity of the city.

References 

Populated places in Damietta Governorate